Habicht is a German surname. Notable people with the surname include:

 Theodor Habicht (1898–1944) leading political figure in Nazi Germany
 Christian Habicht (historian) (1926)
 Christian Habicht (actor) 
 Florian Habicht (born 1975) German born New Zealand film director
 :de:Julius Habicht (1874–1912), German architect
 :de:Ludwig Habicht (1830–1908), German writer
 :de:Max Habicht (1775–1839), German arabist
 :de:Viktor Habicht (1822–1902), German pastor and politician
 :de:Waltraud Habicht (1935), German actress

See also
 Habicht (disambiguation)

German-language surnames